Mechit Buttress (‘Rid Mechit’ \'rid me-'chit\) is the ice-covered buttress rising to 1891 m between Moser Glacier, Woodbury Glacier and Montgolfier Glacier on Danco Coast in Graham Land, Antarctica.  It is linked by a saddle to Forbidden Plateau to the southeast.

The feature is named after Mechit Peak in Rila Mountain, Bulgaria.

Location
British mapping in 1980.

Maps
 Antarctic Digital Database (ADD). Scale 1:250000 topographic map of Antarctica. Scientific Committee on Antarctic Research (SCAR). Since 1993, regularly upgraded and updated.

Notes

References
 Mechit Buttress. SCAR Composite Antarctic Gazetteer.
 Bulgarian Antarctic Gazetteer. Antarctic Place-names Commission. (details in Bulgarian, basic data in English)

External links
 Mechit Buttress. Copernix satellite image

Mountains of Graham Land
Danco Coast
Bulgaria and the Antarctic